Nicolas Moreau (born 28 June 1969) is a French actor and a theatre director.

Career
Moreau debuted in 1995 in four roles: as Marc, the son of Claude Jade and Georges Claisse in Jacques Richards' television movie Porté disparu; as Andreï in the adaption of Eduard von Keyserling's novel Été Brûlant with Claude Rich and Hélène de Fougerolles; in Denys de La Patellière's last film Maigret et l'affaire Saint-Fiacre (with Bruner Cremer and Claude Winter); and as Luc Béraud in Denys de La Patelliére's Pasteur, cinq années de rage with Bernard Fresson.

After many roles in television movies, he played the role of Émile Bernard in Roger Planchon's film Lautrec.  His television career was followed by, among others, Le Bois du Pardoux (2000) with Annie Girardot and Thierry Chabert's Des jours et des nuits (2005).

Moreau returned to cinema in 2005 in Patrice Chéreau's Gabrielle.

In 2011 he played the role of Louis Eggenberger in Thierry Binisti's Marthe Richard aired on France 3 TV, and the role of Pierre Giacometti in Denis Podalydès's biopic on Sarkozy's rise to power: La conquête.

Theatre work 
In addition to and perhaps more noted than his cinema work have been his theatrical performances. These include
 2010 : AMADEUS, LE CONCERT directed by John Axelrod, (role: Mozart), Orchestre National des Pays de la Loire
 2009 : ONCLE VANIA directed by Patrick Haggiagh
 2007 : A BOUT DE SOUFFLE directed by Thierry Niang
 2006 : PETITS MEURTRES EN FAMILLE by François Roux (Role : Paul) 
 2004/2005 : ANGELE  by Alexandre Dumas directed by Gilles Gleizes
 2004 : LE PEEP SHOW THEATRE- Nicolas MOREAU, Jardins du théâtre du Rond Point
 2003 : L'IMPROMPTU DE VERSAILLES
 2002/2003 :  DOM JUAN, Molière directed by Christophe Thiry 
 2001 : LA FEMME D'UN AUTRE (F. Dostoïevski) directed by Sava Lolov 
 2001: LE PETIT MAITRE CORRIGE, Marivaux directed by Frédéric Tokarz 
 2000: La Vie de Galilée-Bertolt Brecht, directed by Jacques Lassalle, Théâtre national de la Colline
 1999 : LA MENAGERIE DE VERRE- T. Williams directed by Christophe Thiry 
 1998 : MESURE POUR MESURE -W. Shakespeare, directed by Claude Yersin
 1997: Le Radeau de la Méduse by Roger Planchon, directed by the author, at the Théâtre national de la Colline
 1996 : LA TOUR E NESLE - A. Dumas directed by Roger Planchon
 1993 : MINETTI by T. Bernhard
 1992 : RIEN QU'UN MORCEAU DE PAIN - R.W Fassbinder directed by Bruno Bayen
 1991: La Dame de Pique - A. Pouchkine directed by Piotr Fomenko
 1991:  LES PRECIEUSES RIDICULES - Molière, Jean Luc Boutte, Comédie Française
 1991: L'IMPROMPTU DE VERSAILLES - Molière, Jean Luc Boutte, Comédie Française 
 1990 : LORENZACCIO - Francis Huster By A. de Musset

Filmography
The Conquest- Xavier Durringer
CAVALCADE- Steve Suissa
GABRIELLE- Patrice Chereau
GROENLAND- Muriel Breton 
LAUTREC - Roger Planchon  
LE REFUGE- François Ozon
RETURN TO THE DOGS- Lodge Kerrigan
TOUTES LES FILLES SONT FOLLES - Pascale POUZADOUX
The Rendez-Vous of Déjà-Vu - Antonin Peretjatko

Television
 2014 : 2 FLICS SUR LES DOCKS - EPISODE 7 - Edwin BAILY
 2013 : Joséphine, ange gardien : Georges Lannier (1 Episode)
 2012 : 
DE PERE EN FILLE - Jean-Marc SEBAN

PROFILAGE - EPISODE 35, 36 - Julien DESPAUX

PROFILAGE - EPISODE 34 - Alexandre LAURENT

GRAND HOTEL - Benoit D'AUBERT
RIS - Alain BRUNARD

LE SANG DE LA VIGNE - Marc RIVIERE Marthe RICHARD - Thierry Binisti

ANTIGONE 34 - 

ENGRENAGES- Manuel BOURSINAC et Jean-Marc BRONDOLO

UN FLIC - Patrick DEWOLF

SCALP - Xavier Durringer
 
LEA PARKER 2 - Olivier JAMAIN
Episode Rebelle

LE GRAND PATRON- Christian BONNET

DES JOURS ET DES NUITS- Thierry CHABERT

LES MONTANA - Benoît D'AUBERT

NAVARRO - Patrick JAMAIN
Episode Triste carnaval

LES BOIS DU PARDOUX - Stéphane KURC P.J NOYADE - Gérard VERGEZ

UN ANGE PASSE - Bertrand VAN EFFENTERRE

PASTEUR, CINQ ANNEES DE RAGE - Luc BERAUD

MAIGRET L'AFFAIRE SAINT FIACRE - Denys DE LA PATELLIERE  
 
ETE BRULANT- Jérôme FOULON  
PORTE DISPARU- Jacques RICHARD
C'ETAIT LA GUERRE - Maurice FAILEVIC

Recognition

Awards and nominations
2007, nominated for a César Award 'Meilleur son' for Lady Chatterley

References

Other sources 
 Nicolas Moreau at the  l’Internet Movie Database 
 

Living people
1974 births
French male television actors
French male film actors
Place of birth missing (living people)